This list of Manitoba government departments and agencies shows the names and periods of activity for departments of the provincial Government of Manitoba, along with their respective agencies, boards, and commissions.

Current departments and agencies

Former departments and agencies

Notes

References

External links
Government of Manitoba - Departments

Manitoba government departments and agencies